The Mithilanchal Express is an Express train belonging to Eastern Railway zone that runs between  and  in India. It is currently being operated with 13155/13156 train numbers on twice in a week basis.

Service

The 13155/Mithilanchal Express has an average speed of 44 km/hr and covers 620 km in 14h 5m. The 13156/Mithilanchal Express has an average speed of 41 km/hr and covers 620 km in 14h 50m.

Route and halts 

The important halts of the train are:

Coach composition

The train has standard ICF rakes with max speed of 110 kmph. The train consists of 16 coaches:

 2 AC III Tier
 6 Sleeper coaches
 6 General
 2 Seating cum Luggage Rake

Traction

Both trains are hauled by a Howrah Loco Shed-based WAP-4 or Asansol Loco Shed-based WAM-4 electric locomotive from Kolkata to Samastipur. From  Samastipur it is hauled by a Samastipur Loco Shed-based WAP-7 diesel locomotive up till Sitamarhi and vice versa.

Rake sharing

The trains shares its rake with

 13157/13158 Tirhut Express
 13159/13160 Kolkata–Jogbani Express
 13165/13166 Kolkata–Sitamarhi Express

See also 

 Kolkata railway station
 Sitamarhi Junction railway station
 Kolkata–Sitamarhi Express
 Mithila Express

Notes

References

External links 

 13155/Mithilanchal Express
 13156/Mithilanchal Express

Transport in Kolkata
Transport in Sitamarhi
Named passenger trains of India
Rail transport in West Bengal
Rail transport in Jharkhand
Rail transport in Bihar
Railway services introduced in 2006
Express trains in India